The Princess Bride: S. Morgenstern's Classic Tale of True Love and High Adventure, The "Good Parts" Version is a 1973 fantasy romance novel by American writer William Goldman. The book combines elements of comedy, adventure, fantasy, drama, romance, and fairy tale.  It is presented as an abridgment of a longer work by the fictional S. Morgenstern, and Goldman's "commentary" asides are constant throughout. It was originally published in the United States by Harcourt Brace, then later by Random House, while in the United Kingdom it was later published by Bloomsbury.

The book was adapted into a 1987 feature film directed by Rob Reiner from a screenplay written by Goldman.

William Goldman said, "I've gotten more responses on The Princess Bride than on everything else I've done put together—all kinds of strange outpouring letters. Something in The Princess Bride affects people."

A segment of the book was published as "Duel Scene (From The Princess Bride)" in the anthology The Best of All Possible Worlds (1980), which was edited by Spider Robinson. In 2015, a collection of essays on the novel and the film adaptation was published entitled The Princess Bride and Philosophy.

Plot

In a Renaissance-era world, a young woman named Buttercup lives on a farm in the country of Florin. She abuses the farm hand, Westley, calling him "farm boy" and demands that he perform chores for her. Westley's response to her demands is always "As you wish." She eventually realizes that what he is saying is, "I love you." After Buttercup realizes that she loves him and confesses her feelings, Westley goes to seek his fortune so they can marry. Buttercup later receives a letter that the Dread Pirate Roberts attacked Westley's ship at sea. Believing that Westley is dead, since the Dread Pirate Roberts is famous for not taking captives, Buttercup sinks into despair. Years later, she reluctantly agrees to marry Prince Humperdinck, heir to the throne of Florin.

Before the wedding, a trio of outlaws — the Sicilian criminal genius Vizzini, the Spanish fencing master Inigo Montoya, and the enormous and mighty Turkish wrestler Fezzik — kidnap Buttercup. A masked man in black follows them across the sea and up the Cliffs of Insanity, after which Vizzini orders Inigo to stop the pursuer. Before the man in black reaches the top of the cliff, a flashback of Inigo's past reveals that he is seeking revenge on a six-fingered man who had killed Inigo's father.  When the man in black arrives, Inigo challenges him to a duel. The man in black wins the duel but leaves the Spaniard alive. Vizzini then orders Fezzik to kill the man in black. A flashback showed Fezzik as a lonely boy who was "accepted" by Vizzini. His conscience compelling him to fair play, Fezzik throws a rock as a warning to the man in black and challenges him to a wrestling match. The man in black accepts the challenge and chokes Fezzik until the giant blacks out. The man in black then catches up with Vizzini and proposes a Battle of the Wits, challenging Vizzini to guess which of two cups of wine is poisoned with iocane powder. They drink, and Vizzini dies. The man in black then explains to Buttercup that he had poisoned both cups, having built up an immunity to iocane powder beforehand.

With Prince Humperdinck's rescue party in hot pursuit, the man in black flees with Buttercup. He taunts Buttercup, claiming that women cannot be trusted and that she must have felt nothing when her true love and sweetheart died. She shoves him into a gorge, yelling, "You can die, too, for all I care!" and hears him call, "As you wish!" from the bottom of the ravine. She realizes he is Westley and follows him down into the gorge, to find him battered but largely unhurt. They travel through the Fire Swamp to evade Humperdinck's party. At Buttercup's insistence, Westley tells Buttercup about his experience with the Dread Pirate Roberts and how he secretly became the latest in a line of men to use that identity.

The Fire Swamp has many obstacles, such as Snow Sand and Rodents of Unusual Size (R.O.U.S., pronounced  ). Westley and Buttercup successfully navigate the Fire Swamp, but they are captured by Prince Humperdinck and his cruel six-fingered assistant, Count Tyrone Rugen. Buttercup negotiates for Westley's release and returns with Humperdinck to the palace to await their wedding. Rugen follows Humperdinck's secret instructions not to release Westley, but to take him to his underground hunting arena, the "Zoo of Death". Here, Rugen tortures and weakens Westley with his life-sucking invention, The Machine.

Meanwhile, Buttercup has nightmares regarding her marriage to the prince. She expresses her unhappiness to Humperdinck, who proposes that he send ships to locate Westley, but that if they fail to find him, Buttercup will marry him. The novel reveals that, to start a war with the neighboring country of Guilder, Humperdinck himself had arranged Buttercup's kidnapping and murder, but that he now believes that Buttercup dying on her wedding night will inspire his subjects to fight more effectively.

On the day of the wedding, Inigo meets again with Fezzik, who tells him that Count Rugen is the six-fingered man who killed his father. Knowing that Vizzini is dead, they seek out the man in black hoping that his wits will help them plan a successful attack on the castle to find and kill Count Rugen. Buttercup learns that Humperdinck never sent any ships, and taunts him with her enduring love for Westley. Enraged, Humperdinck tortures Westley to death via The Machine. Westley's screams echo across the land, drawing Inigo and Fezzik to the Zoo of Death. Finding Westley's body, they enlist the help of a magician named Miracle Max who had been fired by Humperdinck. Max pronounces Westley to be merely "mostly dead", and returns him to life (out of a desire to get back at Humperdinck), though Westley remains partially paralyzed and weak.

Westley devises a plan to invade the castle during the wedding, and the commotion caused by this prompts Humperdinck to cut the wedding short. Buttercup decides to commit suicide when she reaches the honeymoon suite. Inigo pursues Rugen through the castle and kills him in a sword fight. Westley reaches Buttercup before she commits suicide. Still partially paralyzed, Westley bluffs his way out of a sword fight with Humperdinck, who shows himself as a coward. Instead of killing his rival, Westley decides to leave him alive. The party then rides off into the sunset on four of the prince's purebred white horses. The story ends with a series of mishaps and the prince's men closing in, but the author indicates that he believes that the group got away.

Context

This novel includes several narrative techniques or literary devices including a fictional frame story about how Goldman came to know about and decided to adapt S. Morgenstern's The Princess Bride. In Goldman's "footnotes," he describes how his father used to read The Princess Bride aloud to him; thus the book became Goldman's favorite without him ever actually reading the text. As a father, Goldman looked forward to sharing the story with his own son, going to great lengths to locate a copy for his son's birthday, only to be crushed when his son stops reading after the first chapter. When Goldman revisits the book himself, he discovers that what he believed was a straightforward adventure novel was in fact a bitter satire of politics in Morgenstern's native Florin, and that his father had been skipping all the political commentary and leaving in only "the good parts." This moves Goldman to abridge the book to a version resembling the one his father had read to him, while adding notes to summarize material he had "removed." Morgenstern and the "original version" are fictitious and used as a literary device to comment on the nature of adaptation and to draw a contrast between the love and adventure of the main story and the mundane aspects of everyday life. The nations of Guilder and Florin are likewise pure fiction.

The narrator of The Princess Bride, while named William Goldman, is persona or author surrogate that mixes fictional elements with some biographical details that match the author's life. Goldman's personal life, as described in the introduction and commentary in the novel, is fictional. In The Princess Bride, Goldman claimed to have one son with his wife, Helen, a psychiatrist. In reality, Goldman married Ilene Jones, a photographer, in 1961. They had two daughters named Jenny and Susanna, and they divorced in 1991. Goldman's commentary contains references to his real-life Hollywood career, including the observation that the famous cliff scene in Butch Cassidy and the Sundance Kid was likely inspired by the Cliffs of Insanity from The Princess Bride. While Goldman did write the screenplay for Butch Cassidy and the Sundance Kid in 1969, it is unclear if all the career references have a basis in truth. The commentary is extensive, continuing through the text until the end.

The book's actual roots are in stories Goldman told to his daughters (aged 7 and 4), one of whom had requested a story about "princesses" and the other "brides". Goldman describes the earliest character names from the "kid's saga" as "silly names: Buttercup, Humperdinck". The countries are both named after coins. The florin was originally an Italian gold coin minted in Florence, and later the name of various currencies and denominations. The guilder was originally a Dutch gold coin, and later the name of various currencies used mainly in the Netherlands and its territories. The two names are often interchangeable.

Goldman said he wrote the first chapter about Buttercup which ran for about 20 pages. Then, he wrote the second chapter, "The Groom", about the man she was going to marry; Goldman only managed to write four pages before running dry. Then he got the idea to write an abridged novel:

Goldman said he was particularly moved writing the scene in which Westley dies.

Reunion scene
In the novel's commentary, Goldman writes that he added nothing to the "original" Morgenstern text. He did write one original scene, a loving reunion between Buttercup and Westley, but, he said, his publisher objected to this addition. He invites any reader who wants to read the "Reunion Scene" to write to the publisher (formerly Harcourt Brace Jovanovich; now Random House) and request a copy. Many readers wrote in to the publisher and did receive a letter, but instead of an extra scene, the letter detailed the (obviously fictitious) legal problems that Goldman and his publishers encountered with the Morgenstern estate and its lawyer, Kermit Shog. This letter was revised and updated periodically; the 1987 revision mentioned the movie, while the 25th Anniversary Edition published the letter with an addendum about Kermit's lawyer granddaughter Carly. The 30th Anniversary Edition has a footnote that the three pages of the reunion scene were now available online. However, the website itself contained nothing but the text of the original three letters. This website has since been taken down and superseded by the Houghton Mifflin Harcourt product page for the book, which provides the 2003 version of the Reunion Scene letter as a digital download.

Buttercup's Baby 
The epilogue to some later editions of the novel, notably the 25th anniversary edition, mentions a sequel, Buttercup's Baby, that was "having trouble getting published because of legal difficulties with S. Morgenstern's estate".  Later editions actually reprint Goldman's "sample chapter".

The chapter consists of a disjointed assemblage of stories about the quartet's escape to "One Tree Island", and the eventual kidnapping of Waverly (Westley and Buttercup's daughter) by a skinless-faced "madman" who eventually throws her off a mountainside. The chapter ends with Fezzik, Waverly's appointed babysitter, leaping off the mountain to save her, and then cradling her to preserve her from the impact that seems certain to spell at least Fezzik's doom. Also noteworthy is a flashback to Inigo's past, his training as a swordsman, and his one-time romantic love interest.

The chapter also continues the author's extensive footnotes after he is outraged to learn that the fiercely protective Morgenstern estate had finally relented to an abridgment of Buttercup's Baby done not by Goldman but by author Stephen King. The footnotes detail Goldman's visit to the fictional nation of Florin, which houses a popular museum devoted to the "real" story of The Princess Bride and contains such artifacts as Inigo's six-fingered sword.

The 30th anniversary edition of The Princess Bride included hints to the sequel's plot, and a promise to have the full version completed before a 50th anniversary edition (2023).

In a January 2007 interview, Goldman admitted he was having difficulty coming up with ideas for the story:

Goldman died in 2018 without completing the sequel.

Adaptations 
In 1982 Ray Harryhausen was approached by British producer Milton Subotsky, who had written a script based on the novel. Harryhausen liked the book but found too many problems with the screenplay. He and Subotsky worked together in an attempt to create a new script, but eventually gave up.

The book was adapted into a 1987 feature film directed by Rob Reiner from a screenplay written by Goldman himself.

Goldman partnered with Adam Guettel to create a musical version of the story with Goldman writing the book and Guettel writing the music, but the two parted ways on the project when Goldman demanded 75% of the author's royalties, though Guettel was writing both the music and the lyrics. Guettel's score was nearly complete, but it is unlikely to be heard beyond an orchestral suite performed at the Hollywood Bowl in 2006.

In November 2013, Disney Theatrical announced that it will be staging a new stage musical version, based on the novel and film screenplay.

In 2008, Toy Vault, Inc. announced it was working on a Princess Bride–based card game due for release in the second quarter of 2008. It also announced that it is working on a board game, the second ever produced for this movie, after a simple board game included with some VHS releases.

Also in 2008, the production company Worldwide Biggies released a computer game, The Princess Bride Game. Several actors from the movie provided voices for their video game counterparts, including Mandy Patinkin as Inigo Montoya, Wallace Shawn as Vizzini, and Robin Wright as Buttercup.

Sierra Online parodied the title of the novel in their computer game King's Quest VII: The Princeless Bride.

In 2014, Game Salute licensed the tabletop game adaptation publishing rights to the Princess Bride; a series of board and card games were released later that year.

In 2019, Toy Vault produced a Role Playing Game written by Steffan O'Sullivan.

On September 13, 2020, the surviving members of the original cast participated in a live script reading that was a fundraiser for the Wisconsin Democratic Party.

In 2021, BBC Radio 4 produced a two-part radio adaptation by Stephen Keyworth (referred to as "The Best Bits of the Good Parts Version"), with the first part broadcast on Christmas Day 2021 and the second on New Year's Day 2022. During the week of 26 December 2021, five mini-episodes, "Bitesize Backstories", dealing with the backstories of the book itself and four of the main characters "which can be enjoyed as stand-alone stories or to enhance [the listener's] experience of the drama", were also broadcast on BBC Radio 4.

See also 
 Ruritanian romance

References

Further reading
 .

External links 

 .

 
1973 fantasy novels
1973 American novels
American fantasy novels adapted into films
Fantasy parodies
Romantic fantasy novels
Romantic comedy novels
American romance novels
Metafictional novels
Novels by William Goldman
Parody novels
Novels about pirates
Harcourt (publisher) books
American comedy novels
Novels set in fictional countries
Books about princesses